Aschwin Wildeboer Faber (born 14 February 1986 in Sabadell, Spain), known as Aschwin Wildeboer, is a Spanish Olympic backstroke swimmer of Dutch origin.

Biography
His parents, both born and raised in Netherlands, moved to Spain in 1978 and settled in Sabadell, where his father Paulus Wildeboer became the head coach of the local swimming club, called Club Natació Sabadell.  He and his parents now live in Denmark, because his father is the Danish national team coach.

Career

Both Aschwin and his older brother, Olaf, a freestyle swimmer, represented Spain at the 2004 Summer Olympics. At the 2004 Olympics, Aschwin was eliminated in the qualifying heats of the 100 m and 200 m backstroke. Since 2004, Aschwin has continued to swim internationally for Spain; however, Olaf began swimming for the Netherlands at the 2006 European Championships.

Aschwin swam again for Spain in the 2008 Summer Olympics, achieving a new Spanish record in the 100 m backstroke (53.51) and finishing seventh.

On 21 December 2008, while swimming at the Spanish Short Course Championships, Wildeboer broke the men's 100-meter backstroke world record with a time of 49.20 seconds—0.13 seconds faster than the previous world record set by Stanislav Donets.

On 1 July 2009, in the Mediterranean Games held in Pescara (Italy), Wildeboer broke the men's 100 m backstroke long course World Record with a time of 52.38—0.16 seconds faster than the previous world record set by Aaron Peirsol in the Beijing Olympics the previous year.  Peirsol soon reclaimed the world record.

See also
 World record progression 100 metres backstroke

Notes

References

 Spanish Olympic Committee

External links
 
 
 
 
 

1986 births
Living people
Spanish male backstroke swimmers
Swimmers from Catalonia
Spanish people of Dutch descent
Olympic swimmers of Spain
Swimmers at the 2004 Summer Olympics
Swimmers at the 2008 Summer Olympics
Swimmers at the 2012 Summer Olympics
World record setters in swimming
World Aquatics Championships medalists in swimming
Medalists at the FINA World Swimming Championships (25 m)
Mediterranean Games gold medalists for Spain
Mediterranean Games medalists in swimming
Swimmers at the 2009 Mediterranean Games